Rodrigo Junqueira Reis Santoro (born 22 August 1975) is a Brazilian actor. He is most known for his portrayal of Persian King Xerxes in the movie 300 (2006) and its sequel 300: Rise of an Empire (2014). Other famous movies include  Brainstorm (2001), Carandiru (2003), Love Actually (2003), Che (2008), I Love You Phillip Morris (2009), and Rio (2011). He also appeared on the television series Lost, portraying the character Paulo, and on HBO's Westworld (2016–2020) as Hector Escaton.

Early life

Santoro was born in Petrópolis, Rio de Janeiro state, to Francesco Santoro, an Italian engineer with roots in Paola, Province of Cosenza, Calabria, and Maria José Junqueira Reis, a Brazilian artist of Portuguese ancestry.

Career

In 1993, while studying Journalism at PUC-Rio, Santoro entered the Actor's Workshop of Rede Globo. 
He went on to play parts in many of Globo's telenovelas, such as Olho no Olho (1993), Pátria Minha (1994), Explode Coração (1995), O Amor Está no Ar (1997), Suave Veneno (1999) and Mulheres Apaixonadas (2003), as well as the miniseries Hilda Furacão (1998), in the role of a priest. Santoro also voiced the titular character in Stuart Little and its sequel in the Brazilian-dubbed versions.

His first major role in a film production came in 2001, with Bicho de Sete Cabeças (Brainstorm) from Brazilian director Laís Bodansky. By the end of the film, he received a standing ovation from the audience. He also went on to win the festival's best actor trophy. After Bicho, his reputation as an actor had been solidified and he was cast as the male lead in Abril Despedaçado (Behind the Sun), one of the nominees for best foreign film in the 2002 Golden Globe Awards. In the 2003 Hector Babenco film Carandiru he played Lady Di, a transgender prisoner.

Canadian director Robert Allan Ackerman signed Santoro for his TV production The Roman Spring of Mrs. Stone after being mesmerized by his performance in Bicho de Sete Cabeças. Since Santoro did not have an agent in North America, Ackerman contacted Santoro's father. He spent two months filming in Rome, alongside such renowned actors as Helen Mirren and Anne Bancroft. Soon after he finished shooting for Mrs. Stone, he received an offer from Columbia Pictures for a part in the blockbuster Charlie's Angels: Full Throttle. This role kick-started his career in Hollywood. After Charlie's Angels, he played Karl, an enigmatic chief designer and the love interest of Laura Linney's character, in the romantic comedy Love Actually, which also co-stars Colin Firth, Lúcia Moniz, Hugh Grant, Emma Thompson, Keira Knightley, and Rowan Atkinson.

Santoro also began obtaining work in the advertising business as he appeared in a commercial campaign with Gisele Bündchen in 2002. He played the male lead in No. 5 The Film, a three-minute-long commercial for Chanel, directed by Baz Luhrmann alongside Nicole Kidman in 2004.

In 2006, Santoro joined the season three cast of the ABC television series Lost as Paulo, a survivor of the Oceanic Flight 815 crash. His first appearance was in the episode "Further Instructions", and his character was killed off in the episode "Exposé". He also voiced the character in the Brazilian-dubbed version of the series.

Santoro was cast as Persian emperor Xerxes in Zack Snyder's film 300 (2006), based on the Frank Miller comic of the same name. The job had many special requirements, which included intensive workout for the physicality of the role (Santoro had previously lost  to star in a Brazilian miniseries), extensive CGI work to portray the 6'2" Santoro as the seven-foot God-King, a four-and-a-half-hour makeup application process and the complete removal of Santoro's body hair first by waxing and then by shaving, which proved too painful. His eyebrows were kept intact, however, covered over with prosthetics and drawn in rather than being shaved. Santoro read the works of Herodotus, an Ancient Greek historian, in order to prepare for his part. Regarding Xerxes, he has stated:

For his role in 300, Santoro became the first Brazilian actor nominated for the MTV Movie Awards in the category of Best Villain. He did not win however, with the award going to Jack Nicholson for The Departed.

After playing the late footballer Heleno de Freitas in the 2012 film Heleno, Santoro co-starred alongside Arnold Schwarzenegger in the 2013 film The Last Stand before playing Garriga in the Will Smith drama film Focus (2015).

Santoro played Jesus in the 2016 historical action film Ben-Hur and received personal blessings from Pope Francis for the role.

Personal life

Santoro has been in a relationship with Brazilian actress Mel Fronckowiak since 2013. On 22 May 2017, they welcomed their first child, a daughter named Nina.

Filmography

Film

Television

Music videos

Awards and nominations

Other nominations and honors
 2004: On People Magazine's 50 Most Beautiful list 2004
 2006: 12th position on People Magazine's 2006 Sexiest Man Alive
 2008: 16th position on E!'s 2008 Sexiest man of the world

References

External links

1975 births
Living people
Male actors from Petrópolis
Brazilian people of Italian descent
Brazilian people of Portuguese descent
Brazilian male television actors
Brazilian male film actors
20th-century Brazilian male actors
21st-century Brazilian male actors
Pontifical Catholic University of Rio de Janeiro alumni
Brazilian expatriates in the United States
Brazilian actors
Chopard Trophy for Male Revelation winners